We Knew It Was Not Going to Be Like This is the second studio album by New Zealand band Surf City. It was released in September 2013 under Fire Records.

Track listing

References

2013 albums
Fire Records (UK) albums